Pjotr Degtjarjov (born 10 July 1993, Tallinn) is an Estonian breaststroke and freestyle swimmer. He is 32-time long course and 26-time short course Estonian swimming champion. He has broken 20 Estonian records in swimming.

References

1993 births
Living people
Estonian male breaststroke swimmers
Estonian male freestyle swimmers
Swimmers from Tallinn
Swimmers at the 2010 Summer Youth Olympics
Estonian people of Russian descent
21st-century Estonian people